Hamza Mansouri (born 13 April 1999) is an Algerian cyclist. He competed in the men's road race event at the 2020 Summer Olympics. His brother Islam is also a cyclist.

Major results

2016
 African Junior Road Championships
1st  Road race
3rd  Time trial
 National Junior Road Championships
1st  Road race
1st  Time trial
2017
 African Junior Road Championships
1st  Road race
1st  Time trial
1st  Team time trial
 1st  Time trial, Arab Junior Road Championships
 1st  Arab Under-23 XCO Championships
 African Junior Track Championships
2nd  Omnium
3rd  Sprint
3rd  Keirin
2018
 1st  Time trial, National Under-23 Road Championships
 1st Overall Tour des Aéroports
1st Stage 6
 2nd Time trial, National Road Championships
2019
 1st  Time trial, National Under-23 Road Championships
 4th Time trial, National Road Championships
 8th Overall Tour du Faso
1st Stage 8
2021
 1st  Time trial, National Under-23 Road Championships
 2nd Time trial, National Road Championships
 African Road Championships
3rd  Team time trial
4th Time trial
 8th Overall Tour du Faso
2022
 National Road Championships
2nd Time trial
4th Road race
 African Road Championships
3rd  Team time trial
9th Time trial
 9th Time trial, Mediterranean Games
2023
 1st  Team time trial, African Road Championships

References

External links

1999 births
Living people
Algerian male cyclists
Olympic cyclists of Algeria
Cyclists at the 2020 Summer Olympics
Place of birth missing (living people)
21st-century Algerian people
Mediterranean Games competitors for Algeria
Competitors at the 2022 Mediterranean Games
20th-century Algerian people